Anwar Bakht Choudhury (born 15 June 1959) is a British diplomat of Bangladeshi origin. He was Governor of the Cayman Islands until he was recalled in June 2018 after less than three months in post. Prior to that, he was British Ambassador to Peru, Director of International Institutions at the Foreign & Commonwealth Office and High Commissioner to Bangladesh.

Early life
Choudhury was born on 15 June 1959, to a Bengali Muslim family in East Pakistan (now Bangladesh). His family is originally from the village of Prabhakarpur, Patli Union, Jagannathpur, Sunamganj, and moved to the United Kingdom when he was young.

Education
Choudhury followed an unusual route into the Diplomatic Service; in 1985, he attained a BSc in Electrical and Electronic Engineering from the University of Salford. He worked at Siemens Plessey, before entering the Civil Service as an engineering strategist with the Royal Air Force. In 1995, he graduated with a Master of Business Administration from Durham University.

Career
Choudhury was promoted through the Ministry of Defence until 2000, when he was recruited by the Cabinet Office, before being headhunted for the position of High Commissioner to Bangladesh. He was succeeded in 2008 by Stephen Evans. When he was appointed as High Commissioner to Bangladesh in 2004, he became one of the first two British ambassadors from ethnic minority backgrounds to be appointed in modern times (the other being Alp Mehmet, who was appointed Ambassador to Iceland). He was sworn in as Governor of the Cayman Islands on 26 March 2018.

Grenade attack

On 21 May 2004, Choudhury was targeted in a failed grenade attack, in which he was wounded and two bystanders were killed. The attempted assassination came as he was leaving the Dargah-e-Shah Jalal mosque in Sylhet Division, his home province, following Jumu'ah (Friday prayers). In December 2008, three attackers were sentenced to death
and two others to life in prison for the attack.

Recall to London
Choudhury was recalled to London in June 2018 for multiple allegations of misconduct. On 20 September 2018 it was announced that he would not be returning to the Cayman Islands.

Personal life
Choudhury is a Muslim. His main interests include folk music of Bengal (baul). He is also passionate about community integration and protection of the UK abroad. He is married to Momina Choudhury and has three daughters. He also has a son from his first marriage. He has three brothers. His hobbies include playing cricket and bridge. He has interest in Bangladeshi cuisine too. 

Choudhury has dismissed suggestions of a conflict of loyalty, stating that he would support the English cricket team against the one in Bangladesh.

See also
 British Bangladeshi
 List of British Bangladeshis
 List of High Commissioners of the United Kingdom to Bangladesh
 List of diplomats of the United Kingdom to Peru

References

External links

Profile on UK Government Portal

1959 births
Living people
Bangladeshi Muslims
British Muslims
Bangladeshi emigrants to England
Governors of the Cayman Islands
British people of Bangladeshi descent
Naturalised citizens of the United Kingdom
High Commissioners of the United Kingdom to Bangladesh
Ambassadors of the United Kingdom to Peru
Civil servants in the Ministry of Defence (United Kingdom)
Civil servants in the Cabinet Office
People from Aylesbury
Alumni of Durham University
Alumni of the University of Salford
People from Patli Union